This article lists political parties in Saba. Saba has a multi-party system with few political parties,

Parties

Active Parties

Defunct Parties
Saba United Democratic Party (SUDP)
Saba Democratic Labour Movement (SDLM)
Saba United Party (SUP)

References

See also
 List of political parties by country

 
Saba
+SAba